FC Bakhchisaray was a football team based in Bakhchisaray, 
Crimea.

The club was founded in 2015. The initiator of the creation of the professional football club "Bakhchisaray" was the head of the city administration of Bakhchisaray, Vladimir Verkhovod. Also at the origins of the formation of the club was a local businessman Dzhelil Bektash. The professional club was created on the basis of the municipal autonomous institution "Institute for the Development of Bakhchisaray".

In 2017, after the relegation from the Crimean Premier League, the club was moved to Simferopol.

Team names
 2015–2016: FC Bakhchisaray
 2015–2017: FC KFU-Bakhchisaray

Honours

Crimean Premier League (1st Tier)
  2015–16
CFU Cup (National Cup)
  2015–16

League and cup history (Crimea)
{|class="wikitable"
|-bgcolor="#efefef"
! Season
! Div.
! Pos.
! Pl.
! W
! D
! L
! GS
! GA
! P
!Domestic Cup
!colspan=2|Europe
!Notes
|-
|align=center|2015
|align=center|1st All-Crimean Championship Gr. A
|align=center|6/10
|align=center|9
|align=center|3
|align=center|5
|align=center|1
|align=center|20
|align=center|14
|align=center|14
|align=center|
|align=center|
|align=center|
|align=center bgcolor=brick|Reorganization of competitions
|-
|align=center|2015–16
|align=center|1st Premier League
|align=center bgcolor=tan|3/8
|align=center|28
|align=center|12
|align=center|5
|align=center|11
|align=center|45
|align=center|46
|align=center|41
|align=center bgcolor=gold|Winner
|align=center|
|align=center|
|align=center|
|-
|align=center|2016–17
|align=center|1st Premier League
|align=center|8/8
|align=center|28
|align=center|2
|align=center|2
|align=center|24
|align=center|19
|align=center|91
|align=center|8
|align=center bgcolor=tan| finals
|align=center|
|align=center|
|align=center bgcolor=pink|Relegated
|-
|}

References

External links
Official website 

 
Defunct football clubs in Bakhchisaray
Association football clubs established in 2015
Association football clubs disestablished in 2017
2015 establishments in Russia
2017 disestablishments in Russia